Marcos Hugo Zarich (17 March 1940 – 5 November 2017) was an Argentine football midfielder. He played most of his club career for River Plate and Boca Juniors and played for Argentina at the 1960 Summer Olympics.

Playing career
Born in Villa Eloísa, Santa Fe, Zarich emerged from the youth team of Club Atlético River Plate. He would play in the Argentine Primera División for River Plate, Club Atlético Atlanta, Club Atlético Boca Juniors, Quilmes Atlético Club and Racing Club de Avellaneda.

In 1969, Zarich moved abroad to play for Deportivo Toluca F.C. in the Mexican Primera División.

Zarich played for Argentina at the 1960 Summer Olympics in Rome.

References

External links

Profile at BDFA

1940 births
2017 deaths
Argentine footballers
Olympic footballers of Argentina
Footballers at the 1960 Summer Olympics
Argentine Primera División players
Liga MX players
Club Atlético River Plate footballers
Club Atlético Atlanta footballers
Boca Juniors footballers
Quilmes Atlético Club footballers
Racing Club de Avellaneda footballers
Deportivo Toluca F.C. players
Argentine expatriate footballers
Expatriate footballers in Mexico
Association football midfielders
Sportspeople from Santa Fe Province